The 1938 World Table Tennis Championships were held in London from January 24 to January 29, 1938. The pool stages were held at the Royal Albert Hall with the finals at the Wembley Empire Pool and Sports Arena.

Medalists

Team

Individual

References

External links
ITTF Museum

 
World Table Tennis Championships
World Table Tennis Championships
World Table Tennis Championships
International sports competitions in London
Table tennis competitions in the United Kingdom
World Table Tennis Championships